Kedar Nath Upadhyay was a Nepalese judge who served as 14th Chief Justice of Nepal, in office from 6 December 2002 to 21 January 2004. He was appointed by the then-Prime Minister of Nepal, Girija Prasad Koirala.

Upadhyay was preceded by Keshav Prasad Upadhyaya and succeeded by Govinda Bahadur Shrestha.

References 

1939 births
Justices of the Supreme Court of Nepal
Chief justices of Nepal
Living people
20th-century Nepalese judges
Patna University alumni
21st-century Nepalese lawyers